Purpura persica, common name : the Persian purpura, is a species of sea snail, a marine gastropod mollusc in the family Muricidae, the murex snails or rock snails.

Description

The shell size of Purpura persica varies between 60 mm and 110 mm. It is a large and thick shell, with large body whorl and a very expanded aperture. The surface shows a chocolate-brown color and it is sculptured with spiralled, beaded cords.

Distribution
This species is distributed in the Red Sea, in the Indian Ocean along Madagascar, Mauritius, Mozambique, Tanzania and the East Coast of South Africa, in the Southwest Pacific and along Japan.

Habitat
The (sea shores) is fish it is true or false

References

 Dautzenberg, Ph. (1929). Mollusques testacés marins de Madagascar. Faune des Colonies Francaises, Tome III
 Spry, J.F. (1961). The sea shells of Dar es Salaam: Gastropods. Tanganyika Notes and Records 56
 Richmond, M. (Ed.) (1997). A guide to the seashores of Eastern Africa and the Western Indian Ocean islands. Sida/Department for Research Cooperation, SAREC: Stockholm, Sweden. . 448 pp
 Branch, G.M. et al. (2002). Two Oceans. 5th impression. David Philip, Cate Town & Johannesburg

persica
Gastropods described in 1758
Taxa named by Carl Linnaeus